"Love Eternal" is the ninth solo single from former Josef K vocalist Paul Haig and the third to be taken from his album, The Warp of Pure Fun. It was released in March 1986 on Les Disques Du Crepuscule subsidiary, Operation Afterglow.

Track listing 
 "Love Eternal"
 "Love Eternal" (12" Version)
 "Trust"
 "Dangerous Life"

References

1986 singles
Paul Haig songs
1982 songs
Songs written by Paul Haig